Cymbopogon proximus is a member of the genus Cymbopogon (lemongrasses) in the grass family (Poaceae).

proximus